Georges Van Den Bossche (15 July 1892 – 16 May 1966) was a Belgian rower. He competed at the 1912 Summer Olympics in Stockholm with the men's coxed four where they were eliminated at the quarter finals and at the 1920 Summer Olympics in Antwerp with the men's coxed pair where he together with his brother Oscar was eliminated in round one.

References

1892 births
1966 deaths
Belgian male rowers
Olympic rowers of Belgium
Rowers at the 1912 Summer Olympics
Rowers at the 1920 Summer Olympics
European Rowing Championships medalists
20th-century Belgian people